Daniel Paul Schrag (born January 25, 1966) is the Sturgis Hooper Professor of Geology, Professor of Environmental Science and Engineering at Harvard University and Director of the Harvard University Center for the Environment.  He also co-directs the Science, Technology and Public Policy Program at the Belfer Center for Science and International Affairs at the Harvard University Harvard Kennedy School. He is also an external professor at the Santa Fe Institute.

He has also worked on a variety of clean energy projects incorporating carbon capture and storage to reduce emissions from power plants, fuel refineries and fertilizer plants. With John Marshall, he co-founded The Potential Energy Coalition, an environmental NGO aimed at deploying more effective communication strategies around climate change.  With Eric Love, he co-founded The Carbon Endowment, an environmental NGO aimed at acquiring underground coal reserves and conserving them in perpetuity.  He has served on the advisory boards of a variety of clean energy companies including Kobold Metals, a company trying to accelerate the discovery of critical metals for lithium ion batteries.

Early life and education 
Schrag received his B.S. in geology & geophysics and political science from Yale University in 1988. He received his Ph.D. in geology from University of California, Berkeley in 1993 under the supervision of Donald J. DePaolo, co-advised by Frank Richter from the University of Chicago.

Career 
Much of his early research focused on reconstructing past climate change, including work on a deep sea sediments from the Cretaceous and early Cenozoic; theories for Pleistocene ice-age cycles, including a new way of reconstructing deep ocean temperature and salinity using pore fluids; and reconstructing tropical climate variability from geochemical variations in corals and trees.  His work on radiocarbon in corals with Tom Guilderson led to an interest in the oceanography of the tropical Pacific, including recent work on possible mechanisms for decadal variability.  He has also worked on more ancient times in Earth history, collaborating with his colleague Paul F. Hoffman on developing and extending the Snowball Earth hypothesis, as well as work on developing a mechanistic understanding for how atmospheric oxygen has evolved through Earth history. His interest in modern and future climate change led to a focus on technological approaches to mitigating future climate change, including work on carbon capture and storage (CCS), low-carbon options for transportation fuels, and a wide variety of other issues in energy technology and policy including direct air capture of carbon dioxide.

Current 

 Sturgis Hooper Professor of Geology, Professor of Environmental Science and Engineering, Harvard University
 Co-Director, Science, Technology, and Public Policy Program, Harvard Kennedy School
 Director, Harvard University Center for the Environment
 External Faculty and Co-Chair of Science Board, Santa Fe Institute 
 Board Chair and co-founder, The Carbon Endowment
 Board member and co-founder, Potential Energy Coalition

Past 

 2014-2021 Area Chair for Environmental Science and Engineering, Harvard University
 2009-2017 President Obama's Council of Advisors for Science and Technology (PCAST)
 2011-2018 Chair, Environmental Advisory Board, JPB Foundation
 2002-2005 Board of Reviewing Editors, Science
 1997-2000 Associate Professor, Dept. of Earth and Planetary Sciences, Harvard University
 1995-2014 Senior Fellow, Canadian Institute for Advanced Research
 1994-1997 Assistant Professor, Dept. of Geosciences, Princeton University
 1993 Visiting Researcher, Indiana University 
 1988 Geologist, Newmont Mining

Memberships 

 American Geophysical Union
 Geochemical Society
 American Meteorological Society
 American Association for the Advancement of Science (AAAS)

Awards and honors 

 Member, American Academy of Arts and Sciences (2019)
 Fellow, American Association for the Advancement of Science (2012)
 James B. Macelwane Medal, American Geophysical Union (2001)
 MacArthur Fellow (2000)
 Technology Review TR100 – 100 young innovators for the next century (1999)
 Ocean Drilling Program Fellowship, Berkeley (1992)
 Samuel Lewis Penfield Prize in Mineralogy, Yale (1988)
 Katherine K. Walker Prize in Political Science, Yale (1988)
 Frank M. Patterson Prize in Political Science, Yale (1987)
 Westinghouse Science Talent Search Finalist (1984)

References

External links
Daniel Schrag - Harvard University
Snowball Earth Theory
“IDEAS Boston; WGBH Forum Network; Daniel Schrag: Geoengineering,” 2008-10-30, WGBH, American Archive of Public Broadcasting (GBH and the Library of Congress), Boston, MA and Washington, DC.

American geologists
Harvard University faculty
Yale University alumni
University of California, Berkeley alumni
MacArthur Fellows
Living people
1966 births
Santa Fe Institute people